Dicerca asperata is a species of metallic wood-boring beetle in the family Buprestidae. It is found in North America.

References

Further reading

 
 
 

Buprestidae
Beetles of North America
Beetles described in 1837
Taxa named by François-Louis Laporte, comte de Castelnau
Articles created by Qbugbot